The Battle of Pino de Baire, also known as the Primera Carga al Machete, occurred on 25 October 1868 during the beginning of the Ten Years' War. It was the first instance of the reputable machete charge in the war that became a common mambí tactic.

The events

The column was armed with swords and bayonets while the mambises carried mostly machetes, pitchforks, and other farming tools. Due to the superior quality of Spanish equipment, Gómez decided to engage in close combat with machetes, a weapon he was familiar with from his service in the Dominican Republic.

The battle was disastrous for the Spanish column, who disorderly retreated after suffering numerous casualties. The column retreated to Santiago de Cuba with near one third of the men lost. In this retreat the force left behind firearms, ammunition, and a train of artillery. The mambises were left with a few men injured.

Film depiction
The battle was depicted in the 1969 black and white film La primera carga al machete directed by Manuel Octavio Gómez.

References

Bibliography
“La primera carga al machete, de Manuel Octavio Gómez: Cine, mito y revolución” Artículo de Santiago Juan-Navarro publicado en Cinéma et Révolution cubaine. Eds. Julie Amiot and Nancy Berthier. Lyon: Université Lyon 2 – GRIMH, 2006. 105–113.

Santiago de Cuba Province
1868 in Cuba
Conflicts in 1868
Ten Years' War
Battles involving Cuba
Battles involving Spain